Dendrocera is a genus of moths belonging to the family Zygaenidae.

Species
Species:

Dendrocera bipuncta 
Dendrocera quadripunctata

References

Zygaenidae
Zygaenidae genera